Luis Alberto Alí Vega (born 17 April 1994) is a Bolivian footballer who plays as a forward for Independiente Petrolero.

Club career
Born in La Paz, Alí represented Argentinian club Club Atlético Huracán, La Paz F.C., Spanish club UE Lleida as a youth, before switching to the academy of CA Osasuna on 5 July 2010. While at Lleida, he was a target of Real Madrid, Chelsea, Tottenham Hotspur and FC Barcelona. He scored his first goal for the reserves in a 2–1 defeat against Racing de Santander B. In 2013, he was loaned out to Erri-Berri.

In 2014, Alí signed for Bolivian club Club Bolívar and was loaned off to Club Deportivo San José after being found surplus; scoring a career best of 14 goals in the 2016–17 season.

Alí moved abroad and signed for Brazilian club Ponte Preta on 10 July 2017. On 20 August 2017, he made his first team debut in a 2–1 home win against Botafogo, replacing Lucca in the 77th minute.

Alí re-joined Club Bolívar for the 2019 season. A month after arriving at Bolívar, Alí torn his posterior cruciate ligament and the radial meniscus of his left knee. He returned to play six and a half months later, before shortly after suffering a fibula fracture. His contract with Bolívar was due to expire in December 2019, but was extended while he completed recovery, until March. After a horrible season due to the two injuries he suffered, with operations included, Alí left the club at the end of the year when his contract expired, after the club chose not to renew it.

Alí remained without club until January 2021, where he signed with Independiente Petrolero.

Honours
Bolívar
Bolivian First Division (2): 2014 Apertura, 2015 Clausura

References

External links

1994 births
Living people
Association football forwards
Bolivian footballers
CA Osasuna B players
Club Bolívar players
Associação Atlética Ponte Preta players
Club San José players
FC Hermannstadt players
Club Independiente Petrolero players
Bolivian Primera División players
Segunda División B players
Tercera División players
Campeonato Brasileiro Série A players
Liga I players
Bolivian expatriate footballers
Bolivian expatriate sportspeople in Brazil
Bolivian expatriate sportspeople in Spain
Bolivian expatriate sportspeople in Romania
Expatriate footballers in Brazil
Expatriate footballers in Spain
Expatriate footballers in Romania
Bolivia international footballers